Daverio is a comune (municipality) in the Province of Varese in the Italian region Lombardy, located about  northwest of Milan and about  southwest of Varese.

Daverio borders the following municipalities: Azzate, Bodio Lomnago, Casale Litta, Crosio della Valle, Galliate Lombardo.

Population history

References

Cities and towns in Lombardy